Raúl Díaz Arce (born February 1, 1970) is a Salvadoran former professional footballer who played as a forward.
He is El Salvador's most prolific goal scorer, with 39 goals in just 68 appearances.

Playing career

1985 to 1986 Arce played for Deportivo Jalapa in Guatemala. 

From 1988 to 1991, Arce played for Dragon in the Salvadoran second division, where he was the league's leading scorer in the 1991/92 season with 21 goals. Playing for Dragon, in two seasons in first division, Ignacio Raul scored 34 goals (89/90 = 13 90/91 = 21), in the second season he was the scoring champion of the regular season when he played four laps. 

He then moved up to play for C.D. Luis Ángel Firpo of the Salvadoran first division from 1991 to 1996. Here he won the league's top scorer three season in a row (1993–1996) with 24, 21 and 25, respectively. In Luis Ángel Firpo he scored in five seasons with a total of 119 goals. These early achievements earned him a spot in the national team and employment in the U.S. Soccer.

D.C. United
In 1996, Diaz Arce signed with Major League Soccer, and was drafted tenth overall in the MLS Inaugural Player Draft by D.C. United.  He quickly established himself as a dangerous striker in the league, scoring 23 goals in his first season with United, second in the league behind Roy Lassiter, and still the fifth best single-season mark in MLS history. Diaz Arce was also the first player in MLS history to score a hat-trick in postseason play. He scored 3 against the Tampa Bay Mutiny on October 10, 1996. DC United won 4-1 and went on to become the first MLS Champions. Diaz Arce continued to light things up in his second season, registering 15 goals, and helping D.C. United to win their second consecutive MLS Cup.

New England Revolution
Salary cap pressures and reported conflicts between Diaz Arce and Marco Etcheverry, resulted in D.C. trading one of the league's most prolific scorers to the New England Revolution in the offseason of 1997.  Diaz Arce continued to excel in New England, scoring 18 goals and 8 assists for his new team.

End of MLS career
Nevertheless, Diaz Arce was traded again, and eventually played for the Tampa Bay Mutiny and San Jose Clash, as well as briefly with the MetroStars, registering 13 goals and 7 assists in the 1999 season.  Diaz Arce continued to be shuttled around in 2000, playing for Tampa Bay and D.C. again in 2000, and scoring a career low 9 goals.  Diaz Arce continued to decline in 2001, playing only briefly for D.C. United, before being traded again to the Colorado Rapids,with whom he ended his career in MLS.

Diaz Arce left MLS second in career goals scored with 82, behind only Roy Lassiter; although he has fallen as Jason Kreis, Jaime Moreno, Ante Razov and Jeff Cunningham and others have surpassed both of their totals.

Charleston & Puerto Rico
For the 2002 season, Diaz Arce played for the Charleston Battery of the A-League, scoring 6 goals and 4 assists in 1319 minutes.  He was not the success Charleston had hoped for, however, and left following the year.  In 2004, Diaz Arce joined the struggling expansion Puerto Rico Islanders, and gave the team a significant boost, scoring two goals in his first game and a total of 7 in 1233 minutes, and helping the team attain a level of respectability. He is now the U.S. Soccer Development Academy Director at the Chicago Magico Soccer Club.

International career
Diaz Arce made his debut for El Salvador in an April 1991 UNCAF Nations Cup qualification match against Nicaragua in which he scored two goals. Over his career, he earned a total of 68 caps, scoring a record 39 goals. He represented his country in 28 FIFA World Cup qualification matches and played at several UNCAF Nations Cups as well as at the 1996 and 1998 CONCACAF Gold Cups.
His final international was a September 2000 FIFA World Cup qualification match against Honduras.

International goals

Scores and results list El Salvador's goal tally first, score column indicates score after each El Salvador goal.

Honours

C.D. Luis Ángel Firpo
 Primera División de Fútbol de El Salvador (2): 1991/92, 1992/93

D.C. United
 MLS Cup (2): 1996, 1997
 MLS Supporters' Shield (1): 1997
 U.S. Open Cup (1): 1996

Charleston Battery
 USL First Division (1): 2003
 Southern Derby (1): 2003

On August 26, 2009, Díaz-Arce was announced as a new member in the DC United Hall of Tradition.

References

External links
 
 

1970 births
Living people
People from San Miguel, El Salvador
Association football forwards
Salvadoran footballers
Salvadoran expatriate footballers
El Salvador international footballers
1996 CONCACAF Gold Cup players
1998 CONCACAF Gold Cup players
C.D. Luis Ángel Firpo footballers
D.C. United players
New England Revolution players
San Jose Earthquakes players
Tampa Bay Mutiny players
Colorado Rapids players
Charleston Battery players
C.D. Águila footballers
Puerto Rico Islanders players
Expatriate soccer players in the United States
Salvadoran expatriate sportspeople in the United States
Expatriate footballers in Puerto Rico
Salvadoran expatriate sportspeople in Puerto Rico
A-League (1995–2004) players
Salvadoran football managers
Major League Soccer players
Major League Soccer All-Stars